The adiabatic theorem is a concept in quantum mechanics.  Its original form, due to Max Born and Vladimir Fock (1928), was stated as follows:
A physical system remains in its instantaneous eigenstate if a given perturbation is acting on it slowly enough and if there is a gap between the eigenvalue and the rest of the Hamiltonian's spectrum.
In simpler terms, a quantum mechanical system subjected to gradually changing external conditions adapts its functional form, but when subjected to rapidly varying conditions there is insufficient time for the functional form to adapt, so the spatial probability density remains unchanged.

Diabatic vs. adiabatic processes 

At some initial time  a quantum-mechanical system has an energy given by the Hamiltonian ; the system is in an eigenstate of  labelled . Changing conditions modify the Hamiltonian in a continuous manner, resulting in a final Hamiltonian  at some later time . The system will evolve according to the time-dependent Schrödinger equation, to reach a final state .  The adiabatic theorem states that the modification to the system depends critically on the time  during which the modification takes place.

For a truly adiabatic process we require ; in this case the final state  will be an eigenstate of the final Hamiltonian , with a modified configuration:

Conversely, in the limit  we have infinitely rapid, or diabatic passage; the configuration of the state remains unchanged:

In 1999  J. E. Avron and A. Elgart reformulated the adiabatic theorem to adapt it to situations without a gap.

Comparison with the adiabatic concept in thermodynamics 
The term "adiabatic" is traditionally used in thermodynamics to describe processes without the exchange of heat between system and environment (see adiabatic process), more precisely these processes are usually faster than the timescale of heat exchange. (For example, a pressure wave is adiabatic with respect to a heat wave, which is not adiabatic.) Adiabatic in the context of thermodynamics is often used as a synonym for fast process.

The classical and quantum mechanics definition is closer instead to the thermodynamical concept of a quasistatic process, which are processes that are almost always at equilibrium (i.e. that are slower than the internal energy exchange interactions time scales, namely a "normal" atmospheric heat wave is quasi-static and a pressure wave is not). Adiabatic in the  context of Mechanics is often used as a synonym for slow process.

In the quantum world adiabatic means for example that the time scale of electrons and photon interactions is much faster or almost instantaneous with respect to the average time scale of electrons and photon propagation. Therefore, we can model the interactions as a piece of continuous propagation of electrons and photons (i.e. states at equilibrium) plus a quantum jump between states (i.e. instantaneous).

The adiabatic theorem in this heuristic context tells essentially that quantum jumps are preferably avoided and the system tries to conserve the state and the quantum numbers.

The quantum mechanical concept of adiabatic is related to adiabatic invariant, it is often used in the old quantum theory and has no direct relation with heat exchange.

Example systems

Simple pendulum 
As an example, consider a pendulum oscillating in a vertical plane.  If the support is moved, the mode of oscillation of the pendulum will change.  If the support is moved sufficiently slowly, the motion of the pendulum relative to the support will remain unchanged.  A gradual change in external conditions allows the system to adapt, such that it retains its initial character. The detailed classical example is available in the Adiabatic invariant page and here.

Quantum harmonic oscillator 

The classical nature of a pendulum precludes a full description of the effects of the adiabatic theorem.  As a further example consider a quantum harmonic oscillator as the spring constant  is increased.  Classically this is equivalent to increasing the stiffness of a spring; quantum-mechanically the effect is a narrowing of the potential energy curve in the system Hamiltonian.

For the special case of a system like the quantum harmonic oscillator described by a single quantum number, this means the quantum number will remain unchanged. Figure 1 shows how a harmonic oscillator, initially in its ground state, remains in the ground state as the potential energy curve is compressed; the functional form of the state adapting to the slowly varying conditions.

For a rapidly increased spring constant, the system undergoes a diabatic process  in which the system has no time to adapt its functional form to the changing conditions. While the final state must look identical to the initial state  for a process occurring over a vanishing time period, there is no eigenstate of the new Hamiltonian, that resembles the initial state.

Avoided curve crossing 

For a more widely applicable example, consider a 2-level atom subjected to an external magnetic field.  The states, labelled  and  using bra–ket notation, can be thought of as atomic angular-momentum states, each with a particular geometry.  For reasons that will become clear these states will henceforth be referred to as the diabatic states.  The system wavefunction can be represented as a linear combination of the diabatic states:

Assuming the magnetic-field dependence is linear, the Hamiltonian matrix for the system with the field applied can be written

Figure 2 shows the dependence of the diabatic and adiabatic energies on the value of the magnetic field; note that for non-zero coupling the eigenvalues of the Hamiltonian cannot be degenerate, and thus we have an avoided crossing.  If an atom is initially in state  in zero magnetic field (on the red curve, at the extreme left), an adiabatic increase in magnetic field  will ensure the system remains in an eigenstate of the Hamiltonian  throughout the process (follows the red curve).  A diabatic increase in magnetic field  will ensure the system follows the diabatic path (the dotted blue line), such that the system undergoes a transition to state .  For finite magnetic field slew rates  there will be a finite probability of finding the system in either of the two eigenstates.  See below for approaches to calculating these probabilities.

These results are extremely important in atomic and molecular physics for control of the energy-state distribution in a population of atoms or molecules.

Mathematical statement 
Under a slowly changing Hamiltonian  with instantaneous eigenstates  and corresponding energies , a quantum system evolves from the initial state

to the final state

where the coefficients undergo the change of phase

with the dynamical phase

and geometric phase

Proofs 
{| class="toccolours collapsible collapsed" width="80%" style="text-align:left"
!Sakurai in Modern Quantum Mechanics
|-
|
This proof is partly inspired by one given by Sakurai in Modern Quantum Mechanics.
The instantaneous eigenstates  and energies , by assumption, satisfy the time-independent Schrödinger equation

at all times . Thus, they constitute a basis that can be used to expand the state

at any time . The evolution of the system is governed by the time-dependent Schrödinger equation

where  (see ).

This coupled first-order differential equation is exact and expresses the time-evolution of the coefficients in terms of inner products  between the eigenstates and the time-differentiated eigenstates. To do so, differentiate both sides of the time-independent Schrödinger equation with respect to time using the product rule to get

Insert this into the differential equation for the coefficients to obtain

To arrive at the adiabatic theorem, neglect the right hand side. This is valid if the rate of change of the Hamiltonian  is small and there is a finite gap  between the energies. This is known as the adiabatic approximation. Under the adiabatic approximation,

which integrates precisely to the adiabatic theorem

with the phases defined in the statement of the theorem.

The dynamical phase  is real because it involves an integral over a real energy. To see that the geometric phase  is purely imaginary, differentiate the normalization  of the eigenstates and use the product rule to find that

Thus,  is purely imaginary, so the geometric phase  is purely real.
|}

{| class="toccolours collapsible collapsed" width="80%" style="text-align:left"
!Adiabatic approximation
|-
|

Proof with the details of the adiabatic approximation
We are going to formulate the statement of the theorem as follows:

 For a slowly varying Hamiltonian  in the time range T the solution of the schroedinger equation  with initial conditions 
 where  is the eigenvector of the instantaneous Schroedinger equation  can be approximated as:  where the adiabatic approximation is:  and   also called Berry phase 

And now we are going to prove the theorem.

Consider the time-dependent Schrödinger equation

with Hamiltonian 

First redefine time as :

At every point in time  can be diagonalized  with eigenvalues  and eigenvectors . Since the eigenvectors form a complete basis at any time we can expand  as:
 where 
The phase  is called the dynamic phase factor. By substitution into the Schrödinger equation, another equation for the variation of the coefficients can be obtained:

The term  gives , and so the third term of left side cancels out with the right side, leaving

The remaining part gives 

For  the  will oscillate faster and faster and intuitively will eventually suppress nearly all terms on the right side. The only exceptions are when  has a critical point, i.e. . Therefore, only the  term will remain in the limit .

In order to show this more rigorously we first need to remove the  term.
This can be done by defining 

We obtain:

This equation can be integrated: 
 
or written in vector notation

Here  is a matrix and
 is basically a Fourier transform.
As last step take the norm on both sides of the above equation:

and apply Grönwall's inequality to obtain 

This concludes the proof of the adiabatic theorem.

In the adiabatic limit the eigenstates of the Hamiltonian evolve independently of each other. If the system is prepared in an eigenstate  its time evolution is given by:

So, for an adiabatic process, a system starting from nth eigenstate also remains in that nth eigenstate like it does for the time-independent processes, only picking up a couple of phase factors. The new phase factor  can be canceled out by an appropriate choice of gauge for the eigenfunctions. However, if the adiabatic evolution is cyclic, then  becomes a gauge-invariant physical quantity, known as the Berry phase.
|}

{| class="toccolours collapsible collapsed" width="80%" style="text-align:left"
!Generic proof in parameter space
|-
|

Let's start from a parametric Hamiltonian , where the parameters are slowly varying in time, the definition of slow here is defined essentially by the distance in energy by the eigenstates (through the uncertainty principle, we can define a timescale that shall be always much lower than the time scale considered).

This way we clearly also identify that while slowly varying the eigenstates remains clearly separated in energy (e.g. also when we generalize this to the case of bands as in the TKNN formula the bands shall remain clearly separated). Given they do not intersect the states are ordered and in this sense this is also one of the meanings of the name topological order.

We do have the instantaneous Schrödinger equation:

And instantaneous eigenstates:

The generic solution:

plugging in the full Schrödinger equation and multiplying by a generic eigenvector:

And if we introduce the adiabatic approximation:
 for each  
We have 

and

where 

And C is the path in the parameter space,

This is the same as the statement of the theorem but in terms of the coefficients of the total wave function and its initial state.

Now this is slightly more general than the other proofs given we consider a generic set of parameters, and we see that the Berry phase acts as a local geometric quantity in the parameter space.
Finally integrals of local geometric quantities can give topological invariants as in the case of the Gauss-Bonnet theorem. 
In fact if the path C is closed then the Berry phase persists to Gauge transformation and becomes a physical quantity.
|}

Example applications 
Often a solid crystal is modeled as a set of independent valence electrons moving in a mean perfectly periodic potential generated by a rigid lattice of ions. With the Adiabatic theorem we can also include instead the motion of the valence electrons across the crystal and the thermal motion of the ions as in the Born–Oppenheimer approximation.

This does explain many phenomena in the scope of:
 thermodynamics: Temperature dependence of specific heat, thermal expansion, melting
 transport phenomena: the temperature dependence of electric resistivity of conductors, the temperature dependence of electric conductivity in insulators, Some properties of low temperature superconductivity
 optics: optic absorption in the infrared for ionic crystals, Brillouin scattering, Raman scattering

Deriving conditions for diabatic vs adiabatic passage 

We will now pursue a more rigorous analysis.  Making use of bra–ket notation, the state vector of the system at time  can be written

where the spatial wavefunction alluded to earlier is the projection of the state vector onto the eigenstates of the position operator

Consider a system Hamiltonian undergoing continuous change from an initial value , at time , to a final value , at time , where .  The evolution of the system can be described in the Schrödinger picture by the time-evolution operator, defined by the integral equation

which is equivalent to the Schrödinger equation.

along with the initial condition .

To determine the validity of the adiabatic approximation for a given process, one can calculate the probability of finding the system in a state other than that in which it started.  Using bra–ket notation and using the definition , we have:

We can expand 

is the system Hamiltonian, averaged over the interval , we have:

After expanding the products and making the appropriate cancellations, we are left with:

giving

where  is the root mean square deviation of the system Hamiltonian averaged over the interval of interest.

The sudden approximation is valid when  (the probability of finding the system in a state other than that in which is started approaches zero), thus the validity condition is given by

which is a statement of the time-energy form of the Heisenberg uncertainty principle.

Diabatic passage 

In the limit  we have infinitely rapid, or diabatic passage:

The functional form of the system remains unchanged:

This is sometimes referred to as the sudden approximation. The validity of the approximation for a given process can be characterized by the probability that the state of the system remains unchanged:

Adiabatic passage 

In the limit  we have infinitely slow, or adiabatic passage.  The system evolves, adapting its form to the changing conditions,

This is referred to as the adiabatic approximation.  The validity of the approximation for a given process can be determined from the probability that the final state of the system is different from the initial state:

Calculating adiabatic passage probabilities

The Landau–Zener formula 

In 1932 an analytic solution to the problem of calculating adiabatic transition probabilities was published separately by Lev Landau and Clarence Zener, for the special case of a linearly changing perturbation in which the time-varying component does not couple the relevant states (hence the coupling in the diabatic Hamiltonian matrix is independent of time).

The key figure of merit in this approach is the Landau–Zener velocity:

A large  results in a large diabatic transition probability and vice versa.

Using the Landau–Zener formula the probability, of a diabatic transition is given by

The numerical approach 

For a transition involving a nonlinear change in perturbation variable or time-dependent coupling between the diabatic states, the equations of motion for the system dynamics cannot be solved analytically. The diabatic transition probability can still be obtained using one of the wide variety of numerical solution algorithms for ordinary differential equations.

The equations to be solved can be obtained from the time-dependent Schrödinger equation:

where  is a vector containing the adiabatic state amplitudes,  is the time-dependent adiabatic Hamiltonian, and the overdot represents a time derivative.

Comparison of the initial conditions used with the values of the state amplitudes following the transition can yield the diabatic transition probability.  In particular, for a two-state system:

See also 
 Landau–Zener formula
 Berry phase
 Quantum stirring, ratchets, and pumping
 Adiabatic quantum motor
 Born–Oppenheimer approximation
 Diabatic
Eigenstate thermalization hypothesis

References 

Theorems in quantum mechanics